Amitabh Bachchan (born as Amitabh Shrivastav; 11 October 1942) is an Indian actor, film producer, television host, occasional playback singer and former politician known for his work in Hindi cinema. He is regarded as one of the most successful and influential actors in the history of Indian cinema. Referred to as the Shahenshah of Bollywood (in reference to his 1988 film Shahenshah), Sadi ka Mahanayak (Hindi for, "Greatest actor of the century"), Star of the Millennium, or Big B. His dominance in the Indian movie scene during the 1970s1980s made the French director François Truffaut call it a "one-man industry".

Bachchan was born in 1942 in Allahabad to the Hindi poet Harivansh Rai Bachchan and his wife, the social activist Teji Bachchan. He was educated at Sherwood College, Nainital, and Kirori Mal College, University of Delhi. His film career started in 1969 as a voice narrator in Mrinal Sen's film Bhuvan Shome. He first gained popularity in the early 1970s for films such as Zanjeer, Deewaar and Sholay, and achieved greater stardom in later years, dubbed India's "angry young man" for several of his on-screen roles in Hindi films. He has since appeared in over 200 Indian films in a career spanning more than five decades,  He has won numerous accolades in his career, including four National Film Awards as Best Actor, Dadasaheb Phalke Award as lifetime achievement award and many awards at international film festivals and award ceremonies. He has won sixteen Filmfare Awards and is the most nominated performer in any major acting category at Filmfare, with 42 nominations overall. In addition to acting, Bachchan has worked as a playback singer, film producer and television presenter. He has hosted several seasons of the game show Kaun Banega Crorepati, India's version of the game show franchise, Who Wants to Be a Millionaire?. He also entered politics for a time in the 1980s.

The Government of India honoured him with the Padma Shri in 1984, the Padma Bhushan in 2001 and the Padma Vibhushan in 2015 for his contributions to the arts. The Government of France honoured him with its highest civilian honour, Knight of the Legion of honour, in 2007 for his exceptional career in the world of cinema and beyond. Bachchan also made an appearance in a Hollywood film, Baz Luhrmann's The Great Gatsby (2013), in which he played a non-Indian Jewish character, Meyer Wolfsheim.

Beyond the Indian subcontinent, he acquired a large overseas following of the South Asian diaspora, as well as others, in markets including Africa (South Africa, Eastern Africa and Mauritius), the Middle East (especially UAE and Egypt), the United Kingdom, Russia, Central Asia, the Caribbean (Guyana, Suriname, and Trinidad and Tobago), Oceania (Fiji, Australia, and New Zealand), Canada and the United States.

Early life and family 

Bachchan was born on 11 October 1942 in Allahabad to the Hindi poet Harivansh Rai Bachchan, and social activist Teji Bachchan. Harivansh Rai Bachchan was an Awadhi Hindu Kayastha, who was fluent in Awadhi, Hindi and Urdu. Harivansh's ancestors came from a village called Babupatti, in the Raniganj tehsil, in the Pratapgarh district, in the present-day state of Uttar Pradesh, in India. Teji Bachchan was a Punjabi Sikh Khatri from Lyallpur, Punjab, British India (present-day Faisalabad, Punjab, Pakistan). Bachchan has a younger brother, Ajitabh, he is 5 years younger than him.

Bachchan's parents were initially going to name him Inquilaab (Hindustani for "Revolution"), inspired by the phrase Inquilab Zindabad (which translates into English as "Long live the revolution") popularly used during the Indian independence struggle; the name Amitabh was suggested to his father by poet Sumitranandan Pant. Although his surname was Shrivastava, Amitabh's father, who opposed the caste system, had adopted the pen name Bachchan ("child-like" in colloquial Hindi), under which he published all of his works. When his father was looking to get him admitted to a school, he and Bachchan's mother decided the family's name should be Bachchan instead of Shrivastava. It is with this last name that Amitabh debuted in films and used for all other practical purposes, Bachchan has become the surname for all of his immediate family. Bachchan's father died in 2003, and his mother in 2007.

He attended Kirori Mal College at the University of Delhi in Delhi. He graduated with Bachelor of Science degree from Kirori Mal College in 1962. When Bachchan finished his studies his father approached Prithviraj Kapoor, the founder of Prithvi Theatre and patriarch of the Kapoor acting family, to see if there was an opening for him, but Kapoor offered no encouragement. Bachchan was a friend of Rajiv Gandhi and Sanjay Gandhi, before he became an actor. He used to spend time with them when he was a resident in New Delhi. Bachchan's family were very close to the Nehru-Gandhi family of politicians. When Sonia Gandhi first came to India from Italy before her marriage, Bachchan had received her at the Palam International Airport on 13 January 1968. She spent 48 days at Bachchan's house with his parents before marriage. Indira Gandhi wanted his future daughter-in-law to learn Hindu customs, way from Bachchan family and she did not think its appropriate to keep daughter-in-law in house before marriage. She trusted Bachchans and decided to keep Sonia at their house.

Bachchan applied for a role as a newsreader for All India Radio, Delhi but "failed the audition". He became a business executive for Bird & Company in Kolkata (Calcutta), and worked in the theatre before starting his film career. It is thought that his mother might have had some influence in Amitabh Bachchan's choice of career because she always insisted that he should "take centre stage".

Acting career

Early career (1969–1972) 
Bachchan made his film debut in 1969, as a voice narrator in Mrinal Sen's National Award-winning film Bhuvan Shome. His first acting role was as one of the seven protagonists in the film Saat Hindustani, directed by Khwaja Ahmad Abbas and featuring Utpal Dutt, Anwar Ali (brother of comedian Mehmood), Madhu and Jalal Agha.

Anand (1971) followed, in which Bachchan starred alongside Rajesh Khanna. His role as a doctor with a cynical view of life garnered Bachchan his first Filmfare Award for Best Supporting Actor. He then played his first antagonist role as an infatuated lover-turned-murderer in Parwana (1971). Following Parwana were several films including Reshma Aur Shera (1971). During this time, he made a guest appearance in the film Guddi which starred his future wife Jaya Bhaduri. He narrated part of the film Bawarchi. In 1972, he made an appearance in the road action comedy Bombay to Goa directed by S. Ramanathan which was moderately successful. Many of Bachchan's films during this early period did not do well. His only film with Mala Sinha, Sanjog (1972) was also a box office failure.

Rise to stardom (1973–1974) 

Bachchan was struggling, seen as a "failed newcomer" who, by the age of 30, had twelve flops and only two hits (as a lead in Bombay to Goa and supporting role in Anand). He was offered with a dual role movie by the director O.P Goyle, and writer O.P Ralhan for the film Bandhe Hath in 1973. This was Bachchan's first movie where he had played double role. Bachchan was soon discovered by screenwriter duo Salim–Javed, consisting of Salim Khan and Javed Akhtar. Salim Khan wrote the story, screenplay and script of Zanjeer (1973), and conceived the "angry young man" persona of the lead role. Javed Akhtar came on board as co-writer, and Prakash Mehra, who saw the script as potentially groundbreaking, as the film's director. However, they were struggling to find an actor for the lead "angry young man" role; it was turned down by a number of actors, owing to it going against the "romantic hero" image dominant in the industry at the time. Salim-Javed soon discovered Bachchan and "saw his talent, which most makers didn't. He was exceptional, a genius actor who was in films that weren't good." According to Salim Khan, they "strongly felt that Amitabh was the ideal casting for Zanjeer". Salim Khan introduced Bachchan to Prakash Mehra, and Salim-Javed insisted that Bachchan be cast for the role.

Zanjeer was a crime film with violent action, in sharp contrast to the romantically themed films that had generally preceded it, and it established Amitabh in a new persona—the "angry young man" of Bollywood cinema. He earned his first Filmfare Award nomination for Best Actor, with Filmfare later considering this one of the most iconic performances of Bollywood history. The film was a huge success and one of the highest-grossing films of that year, breaking Bachchan's dry spell at the box office and making him a star. It was the first of many collaborations between Salim-Javed and Amitabh Bachchan; Salim-Javed wrote many of their subsequent scripts with Bachchan in mind for the lead role, and insisted on him being cast for their later films, including blockbusters such as Deewaar (1975) and Sholay (1975). Salim Khan also introduced Bachchan to director Manmohan Desai with whom he formed a long and successful association, alongside Prakash Mehra and Yash Chopra.

Eventually, Bachchan became one of the most successful leading men of the film industry. Bachchan's portrayal of the wronged hero fighting a crooked system and circumstances of deprivation in films like Zanjeer, Deewaar, Trishul, Kaala Patthar and Shakti resonated with the masses of the time, especially the youth who harboured a simmering discontent owing to social ills such as poverty, hunger, unemployment, corruption, social inequality and the brutal excesses of The Emergency. This led to Bachchan being dubbed as the "angry young man", a journalistic catchphrase which became a metaphor for the dormant rage, frustration, restlessness, sense of rebellion and anti-establishment disposition of an entire generation, prevalent in 1970s India.

The year 1973 was also when he married Jaya, and around this time they appeared in several films together: not only Zanjeer but also subsequent films such as Abhimaan, which was released only a month after their marriage and was also successful at the box office. Later, Bachchan played the role of Vikram, once again along with Rajesh Khanna, in the film Namak Haraam, a social drama directed by Hrishikesh Mukherjee and scripted by Biresh Chatterjee addressing themes of friendship. His supporting role won him his second Filmfare Award for Best Supporting Actor.

In 1974, Bachchan made several guest appearances in films such as Kunwara Baap and Dost, before playing a supporting role in Roti Kapda Aur Makaan. The film, directed and written by Manoj Kumar, addressed themes of honesty in the face of oppression and financial and emotional hardship and was the top-earning film of 1974. Bachchan then played the leading role in the film Majboor. The film was a success at the box office.

Superstardom (1975–1988) 
In 1975, he starred in a variety of film genres, from the comedy Chupke Chupke and the crime drama Faraar to the romantic drama Mili. This was also the year in which Bachchan starred in two films regarded as important in Hindi cinema history, both written by Salim-Javed, who again insisted on casting Bachchan. The first was Deewaar, directed by Yash Chopra, where he worked with Shashi Kapoor, Nirupa Roy, Parveen Babi, and Neetu Singh, and earned another Filmfare nomination for Best Actor. The film became a major hit at the box office in 1975, ranking in at number four. Indiatimes Movies ranks Deewaar amongst the Top 25 Must See Bollywood Films. The other, released on 15 August 1975, was Sholay, which became the highest-grossing film ever in India at the time, in which Bachchan played the role of Jaidev. Deewaar and Sholay are often credited with exalting Bachchan to the heights of superstardom, two years after he became a star with Zanjeer, and consolidating his domination of the industry throughout the 1970s and 1980s. In 1999, BBC India declared Sholay the "Film of the Millennium" and, like Deewaar, it has been cited by Indiatimes Movies as amongst the Top 25 Must See Bollywood Films. In that same year, the judges of the 50th annual Filmfare Awards awarded it with the special distinction award called the Filmfare Best Film of 50 Years.

In 1976, he was cast by Yash Chopra in the romantic family drama Kabhie Kabhie. Bachchan starred as a young poet, Amit Malhotra, who falls deeply in love with a beautiful young girl named Pooja (Rakhee Gulzar) who ends up marrying someone else (Shashi Kapoor). The film was notable for portraying Bachchan as a romantic hero, a far cry from his "angry young man" roles like Zanjeer and Deewaar. The film evoked a favourable response from critics and audiences alike. Bachchan was again nominated for the Filmfare Best Actor Award for his role in the film. That same year he played a double role in the hit Adalat as father and son. In 1977, he won his first Filmfare Best Actor Award for his performance in Amar Akbar Anthony, in which he played the third lead opposite Vinod Khanna and Rishi Kapoor as Anthony Gonsalves. The film was the highest-grossing film of that year. His other successes that year include Parvarish and Khoon Pasina.

He once again resumed double roles in films such as Kasme Vaade (1978) as Amit and Shankar and Don (1978) playing the characters of Don, a leader of an underworld gang and his look-alike Vijay. His performance won him his second Filmfare Best Actor Award. He also gave towering performances in Yash Chopra's  Trishul and Prakash Mehra's Muqaddar Ka Sikandar both of which earned him further Filmfare Best Actor nominations. 1978 is arguably considered his most successful year at the box office since all of his six releases the same year, namely Muqaddar Ka Sikandar, Trishul, Don, Kasme Vaade, Ganga Ki Saugandh and Besharam were massive successes, the former three being the consecutive highest-grossing films of the year, a rare feat in Indian cinema.

In 1979, Bachchan starred in Suhaag which was the highest earning film of that year. In the same year he also enjoyed critical acclaim and commercial success with films like Mr. Natwarlal, Kaala Patthar, The Great Gambler and Manzil. Amitabh was required to use his singing voice for the first time in a song from the film Mr. Natwarlal in which he starred with Rekha. Bachchan's performance in the film saw him nominated for both the Filmfare Best Actor Award and the Filmfare Award for Best Male Playback Singer. He also received Best Actor nomination for Kaala Patthar and then went on to be nominated again in 1980 for the Raj Khosla directed film Dostana, in which he starred opposite Shatrughan Sinha and Zeenat Aman. Dostana proved to be the top-grossing film of 1980. In 1981, he starred in Yash Chopra's melodrama film Silsila, where he starred alongside his wife Jaya and also Rekha. Other successful films of this period include Shaan (1980), Ram Balram (1980), Naseeb (1981), Lawaaris (1981), Kaalia (1981), Yaarana (1981), Barsaat Ki Ek Raat (1981) and Shakti (1982), also starring Dilip Kumar.

In 1982, he played double roles in the musical Satte Pe Satta and action drama Desh Premee which succeeded at the box office along with mega hits like action comedy Namak Halaal, action drama Khud-Daar and the critically acclaimed drama Bemisal. In 1983, he played a triple role in Mahaan which was not as successful as his previous films. Other releases during that year included Nastik and Pukar which were hits and Andha Kanoon (in which he had an extended guest appearance) was an average grosser. During a stint in politics from 1984 to 1987, his completed films Mard (1985) and Aakhree Raasta (1986) were released and were major hits. Bachchan had played a role in a special appearance for the movie Kaun Jeeta Kaun Haara in the year 1987 and he sang a playback song with Kishore Kumar in this movie.

Coolie incident 

On 26 July 1982, while filming a fight scene with co-actor Puneet Issar for Coolie, Bachchan had near-fatal intestinal injury. Bachchan was performing his own stunts in the film and one scene required him to fall onto a table and then on the ground. However, as he jumped towards the table, the corner of the table struck his abdomen, resulting in a splenic rupture from which he lost a significant amount of blood. He required an emergency splenectomy and remained critically ill in hospital for many months, at times close to death. There were long queues of well-wishing fans outside the hospital where he was recuperating; the public response included prayers in temples and offers to sacrifice limbs to save him. Nevertheless, he resumed filming later that year after a long period of recuperation. The director, Manmohan Desai, altered the ending of Coolie: Bachchan's character was originally intended to have been killed off; but, after the change of script, the character lived in the end. Desai felt it would have been inappropriate for the man who had just fended off death in real life to be killed on screen. The footage of the fight scene is frozen at the critical moment, and a caption appears onscreen marking it as the instant of the actor's injury. The film was released in 1983, and partly due to the huge publicity of Bachchan's accident, the film was a box office success and the top-grossing film of that year.

Health Issues 

Later, he was diagnosed with Myasthenia gravis. His illness made him feel weak both mentally and physically and he decided to quit films and venture into politics. At this time he became pessimistic, expressing concern with how a new film would be received, and stating before every release, "Yeh film to flop hogi!" ("This film will flop").

Career fluctuations and sabbatical (1988–1992) 
After a three-year stint in politics from 1984 to 1987, Bachchan returned to films in 1988, playing the title role in Shahenshah, which was a box office success. After the success of his comeback film however, his star power began to wane as all of his subsequent films like Jaadugar, Toofan and Main Azaad Hoon (all released in 1989) failed at the box office. He gained success during this period with the crime drama Aaj Ka Arjun (1990) and action crime drama Hum (1991), for which he won his third Filmfare Best Actor Award, but this momentum was short-lived and his string of box office failures continued. Notably, despite the lack of hits, it was during this era that Bachchan won his first National Film Award for Best Actor for his performance as a Mafia don in the 1990 cult film Agneepath. These years would see his last on-screen appearances for some time. After the release of the critically acclaimed epic Khuda Gawah in 1992, Bachchan went into semi-retirement for five years. With the exception of the delayed release of Insaniyat (1994), which was also a box office failure, Bachchan did not appear in any new releases for five years.

Business ventures and acting comeback (1996–1999) 
Bachchan turned producer during his temporary retirement period, setting up Amitabh Bachchan Corporation, Ltd. (ABCL) in 1996. ABCL's strategy was to introduce products and services covering an entire cross-section of India's entertainment industry. ABCL's operations were mainstream commercial film production and distribution, audio cassettes and video discs, production and marketing of television software, and celebrity and event management. Soon after the company was launched in 1996, the first film it produced was Tere Mere Sapne, which was a moderate success and launched the careers of actors like Arshad Warsi and southern film star Simran.

In 1997, Bachchan attempted to make his acting comeback with the film Mrityudata, produced by ABCL. Though Mrityudaata attempted to reprise Bachchan's earlier success as an action hero, the film was a failure both financially and critically. ABCL was the main sponsor of the 1996 Miss World beauty pageant, Bangalore, but lost millions. The fiasco and the consequent legal battles surrounding ABCL and various entities after the event, coupled with the fact that ABCL was reported to have overpaid most of its top-level managers, eventually led to its financial and operational collapse in 1997. The company went into administration and was later declared a failed company by the Indian Industries board. The Bombay high court, in April 1999, restrained Bachchan from selling off his Bombay bungalow 'Prateeksha' and two flats until the pending loan recovery cases of Canara Bank were disposed of. Bachchan had, however, pleaded that he had mortgaged his bungalow to raise funds for his company.

Bachchan attempted to revive his acting career, and eventually had commercial success with Bade Miyan Chote Miyan (1998) and Major Saab (1998), and received positive reviews for Sooryavansham (1999), but other films such as Lal Baadshah (1999) and Hindustan Ki Kasam (1999) were box office failures.

Return to prominence (2000–present) 

In 2000, Bachchan appeared in Yash Chopra's box-office hit, Mohabbatein, directed by Aditya Chopra. He played a stern, elder figure who rivalled the character of Shahrukh Khan. His role won him his third Filmfare Award for Best Supporting Actor. Other hits followed, with Bachchan appearing as an older family patriarch in Ek Rishtaa: The Bond of Love (2001), Kabhi Khushi Kabhie Gham... (2001) and Baghban (2003). As an actor, he continued to perform in a range of characters, receiving critical praise for his performances in Aks (2001), Aankhen (2002), Kaante (2002), Khakee (2004) and Dev (2004). His performance in Aks won him his first Filmfare Critics Award for Best Actor.

One project that did particularly well for Bachchan was Sanjay Leela Bhansali's Black (2005). The film starred Bachchan as an ageing teacher of a deaf-blind girl and followed their relationship. His performance was unanimously praised by critics and audiences and won him his second National Film Award for Best Actor, his fourth Filmfare Best Actor Award and his second Filmfare Critics Award for Best Actor. Taking advantage of this resurgence, Amitabh began endorsing a variety of products and services, appearing in many television and billboard advertisements. In 2005 and 2006, he starred with his son Abhishek in the films Bunty Aur Babli (2005), the Godfather tribute Sarkar (2005), and Kabhi Alvida Naa Kehna (2006). All of them were successful at the box office. His later releases in 2006 and early 2007 were Baabul (2006), Ekalavya and Nishabd (2007), which failed to do well at the box office but his performances in each of them were praised by critics.

In May 2007, two of his films: the romantic comedy Cheeni Kum and the multi-starrer action drama Shootout at Lokhandwala were released. Shootout at Lokhandwala did well at the box office and was declared a hit in India, while Cheeni Kum picked up after a slow start and was a success. A remake of his biggest hit, Sholay (1975), entitled Ram Gopal Varma Ki Aag, released in August of that same year and proved to be a major commercial failure in addition to its poor critical reception. The year also marked Bachchan's first appearance in an English-language film, Rituparno Ghosh's The Last Lear, co-starring Arjun Rampal and Preity Zinta. The film premiered at the 2007 Toronto International Film Festival on 9 September 2007. He received positive reviews from critics who hailed his performance as his best ever since Black. Bachchan was slated to play a supporting role in his first international film, Shantaram, directed by Mira Nair and starring Hollywood actor Johnny Depp in the lead. The film was due to begin filming in February 2008 but due to the writer's strike, was pushed to September 2008. The film is currently "shelved" indefinitely.

Vivek Sharma's Bhoothnath, in which he plays the title role as a ghost, was released on 9 May 2008. Sarkar Raj, the sequel of the 2005 film Sarkar, released in June 2008 and received a positive response at the box office. Paa, which released at the end of 2009 was a highly anticipated project as it saw him playing his own son Abhishek's Progeria-affected 13-year-old son, and it opened to favourable reviews, particularly towards Bachchan's performance and was one of the top-grossing films of 2009. It won him his third National Film Award for Best Actor and fifth Filmfare Best Actor Award. In 2010, he debuted in Malayalam film through Kandahar, directed by Major Ravi and co-starring Mohanlal. The film was based on the hijacking incident of the Indian Airlines Flight 814. Bachchan declined any remuneration for this film. In 2011 he played an aged retired former gangster in Bbuddah... Hoga Terra Baap who protects his son Sonu Sood who is an honest daring police officer from a notorious gangster Prakash Raj who unknowingly hired the latter to perform a contract killing not knowing that the police officer is the gangster's son. Directed By Puri Jagannadh the film won positive reviews and was a commercial success.

In 2013 he made his Hollywood debut in The Great Gatsby making a special appearance opposite Leonardo DiCaprio and Tobey Maguire. In 2014, he played the role of the friendly ghost in the sequel Bhoothnath Returns. The next year, he played the role of a grumpy father experiencing chronic constipation in the critically acclaimed Piku which was also one of the biggest hits of 2015. A review in Daily News and Analysis (DNA) summarised Bachchan's performance as "The heart and soul of Piku clearly belong to Amitabh Bachchan who is in his elements. His performance in Piku, without doubt, finds a place among the top 10 in his illustrious career." Rachel Saltz wrote for The New York Times, "Piku", an offbeat Hindi comedy, would have you contemplate the intestines and mortality of one Bhashkor Banerji and the actor who plays him, Amitabh Bachchan. Bhashkor's life and conversation may revolve around his constipation and fussy hypochondria, but there's no mistaking the scene-stealing energy that Mr. Bachchan, India's erstwhile Angry Young Man, musters for his new role of Cranky Old Man." Well known Indian critic Rajeev Masand wrote on his website, "Bachchan is pretty terrific as Bhashkor, who reminds you of that oddball uncle that you nevertheless have a soft spot for. He bickers with the maids, harrows his hapless helper, and expects that Piku stay unmarried so she can attend to him. At one point, to ward off a possible suitor, he casually mentions that his daughter isn't a virgin; that she's financially independent and sexually independent too. Bachchan embraces the character's many idiosyncrasies, never once slipping into caricature while all along delivering big laughs thanks to his spot-on comic timing." The Guardian summed up, "Bachchan seizes upon his cranky character part, making Bashkor as garrulously funny in his theories on caste and marriage as his system is backed-up." The performance won Bachchan his fourth National Film Award for Best Actor and his third Filmfare Critics Award for Best Actor.

In 2016, he appeared in the women-centric courtroom drama film Pink which was highly praised by critics and with an increasingly good word of mouth, was a resounding success at the domestic and overseas box office. Bachchan's performance in the film received acclaim. According to Raja Sen of Rediff.com, "Amitabh Bachchan, a retired lawyer with bipolar disorder, takes up cudgels on behalf of the girls, delivering courtroom blows with pugilistic grace. Like we know from Prakash Mehra movies, into each life some Bachchan must fall. The girls hang on to him with incredulous desperation, and he bats for them with all he has. At one point Meenal hangs by Bachchan's elbow, words entirely unnecessary. Bachchan towers through Pink – the way he bellows "et cetera" is alone worth having the heavy-hitter at play—but there are softer moments like one where he appears to have dozed off in court, or where he lays his head by his convalescent wife's bedside and needs his hair ruffled and his conviction validated." Writing for Hindustan Times, noted film critic and author Anupama Chopra said of Bachchan's performance, "A special salute to Amitabh Bachchan, who imbues his character with a tragic majesty. Bachchan towers in every sense, but without a hint of showboating. Meena Iyer of The Times of India wrote, "The performances are pitch-perfect with Bachchan leading the way. Writing for NDTV, Troy Ribeiro of Indo-Asian News Service (IANS) stated, 'Amitabh Bachchan as Deepak Sehgall, the aged defence lawyer, shines as always, in a restrained, but powerful performance. His histrionics come primarily in the form of his well-modulated baritone, conveying his emotions and of course, from the well-written lines.' Mike McCahill of The Guardian remarked, "Among an electric ensemble, Tapsee Pannu, Kirti Kulhari and Andrea Tariang give unwavering voice to the girls' struggles; Amitabh Bachchan brings his moral authority to bear as their sole legal ally.

In 2017, he appeared in the third instalment of the Sarkar film series: Ram Gopal Varma's Sarkar 3. That year, he started filming for the swashbuckling action adventure film Thugs Of Hindostan with Aamir Khan, Katrina Kaif and Fatima Sana Shaikh which released in November 2018. He co-starred with Rishi Kapoor in 102 Not Out, a comedy drama film directed by Umesh Shukla based on a Gujarati play of the same name written by Saumya Joshi. This film released in May 2018 and reunited him with Kapoor onscreen after a gap of twenty-seven years. 

In 2019, he played the role of Badal Gupta in Sujoy Ghosh's Badla. Later that year, he made his Telugu debut in Surender Reddy's Sye Raa Narasimha Reddy as Gosayi Venkanna. He did Gulabo Sitabo in 2020 for which he received Filmfare Critics Award For Best Actor. In 2021, he appeared in Rumy Jaffery's mystery thriller Chehre along with Emraan Hashmi. In 2022, he did 5 films: Jhund, Runway 34, Brahmāstra: Part One – Shiva, Goodbye and Uunchai.

Now he is all set to appear in Nag Ashwin's Project K.

Other work

Television appearances 

In 2000, Bachchan hosted the first season of Kaun Banega Crorepati (KBC), the Indian adaptation of the British television game show, Who Wants to Be a Millionaire?. The show was well received. A second season followed in 2005 but its run was cut short by Star Plus when Bachchan fell ill in 2006.

In 2009, Bachchan hosted the third season of the reality show Bigg Boss.

In 2010, Bachchan hosted the fourth season of KBC. The fifth season started on 15 August 2011 and ended on 17 November 2011. The show became a massive hit with audiences and broke many TRP Records. CNN IBN awarded Indian of the Year- Entertainment to Team KBC and Bachchan. The Show also grabbed all the major Awards for its category.

The sixth season was also hosted by Bachchan, commencing on 7 September 2012, broadcast on Sony TV and received the highest number of viewers thus far.

In 2014, he debuted in the fictional Sony Entertainment Television TV series titled Yudh playing the lead role of a businessman battling both his personal and professional life.

Voice-acting 
Bachchan is known for his deep, baritone voice. He has been a narrator, a playback singer, and presenter for numerous programmes. Some prominent films featuring his narration are Satyajit Ray's 1977 film Shatranj Ke Khiladi. and Ashutosh Gowarikar's 2001 film Lagaan.

He also has done voice-over work for the following movies:

 Bhuvan Shome (1969) 
 Bawarchi (1972) 
 Balika Badhu (1975) 
 Tere Mere Sapne (1996) 
 Hello Brother (1999)
 Lagaan (2001)
 Fun2shh... Dudes in the 10th Century (2003)
 Parineeta (2005) 
 March of the Penguins (2005), Indian version
 Jodhaa Akbar (2008)
 Swami (2007)
 Zor Lagaa Ke...Haiya! (2009)
 Ra.One (2011)
 Kahaani (2012)
 Krrish 3 (2013)
 Mahabharat (2013) 
 Kochadaiiyaan (Hindi Version) (2014)
 CBI documentary (2014) – sanctioned by Central Bureau of Investigation
 The Ghazi Attack (2017)
 Firangi (2017)

Business investments 
Around 1994, Bachchan started Amitabh Bachchan Corporation Ltd (ABCL), an event management, production and distribution company. But the company led into debt with fiasco and gone into bankruptcy, subsequently Bachchan became nearly bankrupt. Reasons of this debacle was flop films such as Mrityudata, Major Saab (produced by this organisation), Miss World 1996 which was organised-managed by ABCL. Due to this he began work for TV, asked for work to Yash Chopra. Once he told that, 'it was darkest time for him'.

He has invested in many upcoming business ventures. In 2013, he bought a 10% stake in Just Dial from which he made a gain of 4600 per cent. He holds a 3.4% equity in Stampede Capital, a financial technology firm specialising in cloud computing for financial markets. The Bachchan family also bought shares worth $252,000 in Meridian Tech, a consulting company in U.S. Recently they made their first overseas investment in Ziddu.com, a cloud based content distribution platform.
Bachchan was named in the Panama Papers and Paradise Papers, leaked confidential documents relating to offshore investment.

Political career 
In 1984, Bachchan took a break from acting and briefly entered politics in support of a long-time family friend, Rajiv Gandhi. He contested Allahabad's seat for the 8th Lok Sabha against H. N. Bahuguna, former Chief Minister of Uttar Pradesh. With 68.2% of the votes in his favour, he won by one of the highest victory margins ever in Indian elections. In 1987, Indian Express said his brother Ajitabh Bachchan owned an apartment in Switzerland, giving rise to speculations about his involvement in the "Bofors scandal", revealed in the year before. Bachchan resigned from his seat in July 1987. Ajitabh Bachchan sued Swedish newspaper Dagens Nyheter for linking him to Bofors payments in 1990 and won damages in the United Kingdom. Sten Lindstrom, the Swedish police chief who had investigated the case, said in 2012 that "Indian investigators planted the Bachchan angle on" Dagens Nyheter.

Bachchan's old friend, Amar Singh, helped him during the financial crisis caused by the failure of his company, ABCL. Thereafter Bachchan started supporting the Samajwadi Party, the political party to which Amar Singh belonged. Jaya Bachchan joined the Samajwadi Party and represented the party as an MP in the Rajya Sabha. Bachchan  appeared in advertisements and political campaigns for the party. His claim that he too was a farmer in the advertisements were questioned in courts.

Bachchan has claimed to have been banned by film press during the emergency years for his family's friendship with Indira Gandhi.

Bachchan has been accused of using the slogan "blood for blood" in the context of the 1984 anti-Sikh riots. Bachchan has denied the allegation. In October 2014, Bachchan was summoned by a court in Los Angeles for "allegedly instigating violence against the Sikh community". Bachchan in an interview with journalist Arnab Goswami offered to fight the case in court and asked the accusers to file the same as also present proof. He was also one of the trustees of Rajiv Gandhi Foundation.

Humanitarian and social causes 

Bachchan has been involved with many social causes. In 2010, he donated  to Resul Pookutty's foundation for a medical centre at Kochi, and he has given  to the family of Delhi policeman Subhash Chand Tomar who died after succumbing to injuries during a protest against gang-rape after the 2012 Delhi gang rape case. He founded the Harivansh Rai Bachchan Memorial Trust, named after his father, in 2013. This trust, in association with Urja Foundation, will be powering 3,000 homes in India with electricity through solar energy. In June 2019 he cleared debts of 2100 farmers from Bihar.

Bachchan was made a UNICEF goodwill ambassador for the polio Eradication Campaign in India in 2002. In 2013, he and his family donated  to a charitable trust, Plan India, that works for the betterment of young girls in India. He also donated  to the Maharashtra Police Welfare Fund in 2013.

Bachchan was the face of the 'Save Our Tigers' campaign that promoted the importance of tiger conservation in India. He supported the campaign by PETA in India to free Sunder, a 14-year-old elephant who was chained and tortured in a temple in Kolhapur, Maharashtra.

In 2014, it was announced that he had recorded his voice and lent his image to the Hindi and English language versions of the TeachAids software, an international HIV/AIDS prevention education tool developed at Stanford University. He has been a vocal "brand ambassador" of the Swachh Bharat Mission (SBM) and featured in a few advertisements to promote the campaign.

In 2020, Bachchan was helping the Government of India promote its public health message concerning COVID-19 before he and some members of his family themselves became infected. He was hospitalised with reported mild symptoms of the disease on 11 July. He was discharged from hospital on 2 August. During the pandemic he lent his support by donating Oxygen concentrators  and 25 cr rupees in various forms.

Personal life 

Bachchan has been married to veteran actress and politician Jaya Bhaduri since June 3, 1973, when he was 30 years old, and together they have two children; Abhishek, an actor, and Shweta, an author, journalist and former model. Abhishek married actress Aishwarya Rai, and they have a daughter named Aaradhya. Shweta is married to businessman Nikhil Nanda who is a part of the Kapoor family of actors. They have a daughter, Navya Naveli, and a son, Agastya. Amitabh's family lives in Mumbai in Maharashtra. His younger brother Ajitabh Bachchan is a businessman. He did business and lived in London for brief period of time. Presently he is living in India. He and his family choose to stay away from limelight. His wife Ramola is a fashion designer and was active in business. Ajitabh has one son, Bhim, and three daughters Naina, Namrata and Nilima. Naina Bachchan is married to actor Kunal Kapoor.

Bachchan was famously rumoured to have had an extramarital affair with actress Rekha in the mid-1970s to the early 1980s after they first acted together in Do Anjaane, and later in many successful films like Khoon Pasina, Ganga Ki Saugandh, Muqaddar Ka Sikandar, Mr. Natwarlal, Suhaag, Ram Balram and ending in Silsila, though they have both denied it.

Filmography

Legacy 

Bachchan is widely regarded as one of the greatest and most influential actors in the history of Indian cinema. He earned respect among critics for his memorable performances and charismatic screen presence, is also considered one of the most respected public figure of India.  Referred to as the "Shahenshah of Bollywood", "Star of the Millennium" or "Big B", He inspired many great and successful Indian cinema actors for many generations including Rajinikanth, Chiranjeevi, Kamal Hassan, Shah Rukh Khan, Akshay Kumar, Manoj Bajpayee, Ajay Devgn, Mohanlal, Ranveer Singh, Allu Arjun and Yash. Referred to as the "Shahenshah of Bollywood", "Star of the Millennium" or "Big B", French director François Truffaut called him a "one-man industry."

In 1999, Bachchan was voted the "greatest star of stage or screen" in a BBC Your Millennium online poll. The organisation noted that "Many people in the western world will not have heard of [him] ... [but it] is a reflection of the huge popularity of Indian films."

In June 2000, he became the first living Asian to have been modelled in wax at London's Madame Tussauds Wax Museum. Another statue was installed in New York in 2009, Hong Kong in 2011, Bangkok in 2011, Washington, DC in 2012 and Delhi in 2017.

In the early 80s, Bachchan authorised the use of his likeness for the comic book character Supremo in a series titled The Adventures of Amitabh Bachchan. In May 2014, La Trobe University in Australia named a Scholarship after Bachchan.

In October 2003, TIME magazine dubbed Bachchan as "the Undisputed Godfather of Bollywood". In April 2005, The Walter Reade Theater of Lincoln Center in New York honored Bachchan with a special tribute, retrospective—titled "Amitabh Bachchan: The Biggest Film Star in the World".

In March 2010, Bachchan has been named the list of CNN's "top 25 Asian actors of all time". He was named "Hottest Vegetarian male" by PETA India in 2012. He also won the title of "Asia's Sexiest Vegetarian male" in a contest poll run by PETA Asia in 2008.

In Allahabad, the Amitabh Bachchan Sports Complex and Amitabh Bachchan Road are named after him. A government senior secondary school in Saifai, Etawah is called Amitabh Bachchan Government Inter College. There is a waterfall in Sikkim known as Amitabh Bachchan Falls.

In 2022, on the occasion of Bachchan's 80th birthday, not-for-profit organisation Film Heritage Foundation announced a film festival as a part of his 11 films collection had screened in 17 cities across the country shown in limited movies theatres.

Autobiography 
Bachchan himself wrote a book in 2002: Soul Curry for You and Me – An Empowering Philosophy That Can Enrich Your Life.

Biographies 
Several books have been written about Bachchan. The following is the listing of books focused on his life career:

Amitabh Bachchan: the Legend was published in 1999,
To be or not to be: Amitabh Bachchan in 2004,
AB: The Legend (A Photographer's Tribute) in 2006,
Amitabh Bachchan: Ek Jeevit Kimvadanti in 2006,
Amitabh: The Making of a Superstar in 2006,
Looking for the Big B: Bollywood, Bachchan and Me in 2007 and
Bachchanalia in 2009.

Awards and honours  

Apart from industry awards won for his performances throughout the years, Bachchan has received several honours for his achievements in the Indian film industry. In 1991, he became the first artist to receive the Filmfare Lifetime Achievement Award, which was established in the name of Raj Kapoor. Bachchan was crowned as Superstar of the Millennium in 2000 at the Filmfare Awards.

In 2001, he was honoured  with the Actor of the Century award at the Alexandria International Film Festival in Egypt in recognition of his contribution to the world of cinema. Many other honours for his achievements were conferred upon him at several International Film Festivals, including the Lifetime Achievement Award at the 2010 Asian Film Awards.

In 2003, he was conferred with the Honorary Citizenship of the French town of Deauville. The Government of India awarded him with the Padma Shri in 1984, the Padma Bhushan in 2001, the Padma Vibhushan in 2015 and Dadasaheb Phalke Award in 2019. The then-President of Afghanistan awarded him the Order of Afghanistan in 1991 following the shooting of Khuda Gawah there. The Government of Madhya Pradesh honoured him with Rashtriya Kishore Kumar Samman for 2002–2003.

France's highest civilian honour, the Knight of the Legion of honour, was conferred upon him by the French Government in 2007 for his "exceptional career in the world of cinema and beyond". On 27 July 2012, Bachchan carried the Olympic torch during the last leg of its relay in London's Southwark.

See also 
 List of Bollywood actors
 Lists of Indian actors

References

Further reading

External links 

 
 
 
 

 
1942 births
Officiers of the Légion d'honneur
Male actors in Hindi cinema
Male actors from Mumbai
Indian actor-politicians
Indian amateur radio operators
Indian male film actors
Hindi film producers
Indian male singers
Bollywood playback singers
Indian television presenters
Indian male voice actors
Living people
Best Actor National Film Award winners
Male actors from Allahabad
Recipients of the Padma Bhushan in arts
Recipients of the Padma Shri in arts
Who Wants to Be a Millionaire?
India MPs 1984–1989
Lok Sabha members from Uttar Pradesh
Recipients of the Padma Vibhushan in arts
Indian male playback singers
People named in the Panama Papers
Film producers from Mumbai
20th-century Indian male actors
21st-century Indian male actors
Male actors in Hindi television
Indian male television actors
Politicians from Allahabad
Film producers from Uttar Pradesh
People from New Alipore
Filmfare Awards winners
Filmfare Lifetime Achievement Award winners
Screen Awards winners
International Indian Film Academy Awards winners
Zee Cine Awards winners
Indian Hindus
Dadasaheb Phalke Award recipients
Actors from Mumbai
People named in the Paradise Papers